Mrvaljević is a montenegrin surname, found in Montenegro, Herzegovina and Serbia. It may refer to:

Draško Mrvaljević (born 1979), Montenegrin handballer
Srđan Mrvaljević (born 1984), Montenegrin judoka
Željko Mrvaljević (born 1981), Montenegrin footballer
Miloš Mrvaljević (born 1989), Montenegrin footballer
Zorica Mrvaljević, Montenegrin writer

Anthropology
A brotherhood in Bjelice is named Mrvaljević.  In the Cetinje municipality, Montenegro, the surname was found in Prediš, Malošin Do and Barjamovica (1941 source).  In the 19th century, a Mrvaljević family settled in Herzegovina. There is a family that inhabits Potkubaš in Stolac and Hatelji in Berkovići. A Mrvaljević family also settled in Toplica, Serbia (1978 source).

References

Serbian surnames